Ignacio Canto (born 21 January 1981) is a Spanish épée fencer.

Canto won the silver medal in the épée team event at the 2006 World Fencing Championships after losing to France in the final. He accomplished this with his teammates Jose Luis Abajo, Juan Castaneda and Eduardo Sepulveda Puerto.

Achievements
 2006 World Fencing Championships, team épée

References

1981 births
Living people
Spanish male épée fencers
Place of birth missing (living people)